Cardross is a small town approximately 15 km south east of Mildura, in north western Victoria, Australia.  At the 2016 census, Cardross and the surrounding area had a population of 821. It was the site of a road fatality in February 2006, in which six teenagers were killed in a hit-run crash.

Cardross named after the Scottish village was established as a farming community in the 1920s, the Post Office opening on 15 June 1925.

Cardross has an Australian Rules football team competing in the Millewa Football League.

Cardross Lakes are southwest of the township.

References

Towns in Victoria (Australia)
Mallee (Victoria)